Zinc finger protein 16 is a protein that in humans is encoded by the ZNF16 gene.

The protein encoded by this gene contains a C2H2 type of zinc finger, and thus may function as a transcription factor. This gene is located in a region close to ZNF7/KOX4, a gene also encoding a zinc finger protein, on chromosome 8. Two alternatively spliced variants, encoding the same protein, have been identified.

References

Further reading